Anthony Mortas (born 13 February 1974) is a French ice hockey player. He competed in the men's tournaments at the 1998 Winter Olympics and the 2002 Winter Olympics.

Career statistics

Regular season and playoffs

France totals do not include stats from the 2001–02 season.

International

References

External links
 

1974 births
Living people
Gothiques d'Amiens players
Hockey Club de Reims players
Olympic ice hockey players of France
Ice hockey players at the 1998 Winter Olympics
Ice hockey players at the 2002 Winter Olympics
Sportspeople from Reims